The 2002 Tostitos Fiesta Bowl, played on January 1, 2002, was the 31st edition of the Fiesta Bowl. The game was played at Sun Devil Stadium in Tempe, Arizona between the Colorado Buffaloes (ranked #3 in the BCS) and the Oregon Ducks (ranked #4 in the BCS). Oregon was ranked #2 in both the AP Poll and Coaches Poll, leading to some controversy that Oregon should have played for the 2002 BCS National Championship.

In the game, Oregon quarterback Joey Harrington threw for 350 yards and 4 touchdowns and led the Ducks to a 38–16 victory. Harrington was named offensive player of the game. Oregon cornerback Steve Smith had three interceptions, a Fiesta Bowl record, and was named defensive player of the game.

This was the first edition of the Fiesta Bowl to match two schools from the Western United States. Previous editions had either only one representative from the West, or none.

Colorado and Oregon became conference rivals when the Buffaloes joined Oregon's conference, the Pac-12 Conference (formerly the Pacific-10 Conference), in 2011.

References

Fiesta Bowl
Fiesta Bowl
Colorado Buffaloes football bowl games
Oregon Ducks football bowl games
Fiesta Bowl
January 2002 sports events in the United States